The Landry River (in French: rivière Landry) is a tributary of Manic 2 Reservoir, which is crossed from North to South by Manicouagan River. It flows into the non organized territory of Rivière-aux-Outardes, in the Manicouagan Regional County Municipality (MRC), in the administrative region of Côte-Nord, in Quebec, in Canada.

Geography 
The Landry River has its source at the mouth of an unidentified lake in Rivière-aux-Outardes.

The initial length of the river was 27.9 km before the raise of water level of the Manic 2 Reservoir.

The Landry River empties at the western end of a strait which goes on  toward east, then  southbound up to the dam of Manic 2 Reservoir. Th is reservoir is crossed to the South by the Manicouagan River.

Toponymy 
The term "Landry" turns out to be a family name of French origin.

The toponym "rivière Landry" was made official on August 2, 1974, at the Commission de toponymie du Québec.

See also 
 List of rivers of Quebec

References 

Rivers of Côte-Nord
Manicouagan Regional County Municipality